Charles Floyd Hensley (born March 11, 1959) is an American former professional relief pitcher who played for the San Francisco Giants of  Major League Baseball (MLB) in their 1986 season.

Sources
, or Retrosheet, or Pura Pelota

1959 births
Living people
Albuquerque Dukes players
American expatriate baseball players in Canada
Baseball players from California
Calgary Cannons players
California Golden Bears baseball players
Lakeland Tigers players
Major League Baseball pitchers
Modesto A's players
People from Tulare, California
Phoenix Firebirds players
Phoenix Giants players
Richmond Braves players
San Francisco Giants players
San Francisco Giants scouts
Shreveport Captains players
Tacoma Tigers players
Tigres de Aragua players
American expatriate baseball players in Venezuela
University of California, Berkeley alumni
Vancouver Canadians players
West Haven A's players
Williamsport Bills players
Sportspeople from Tulare County, California